Juan Manuel "John" Quiñones (born May 23, 1952) is an American ABC News correspondent who hosted What Would You Do?.

Early life and education
Quiñones was born in San Antonio, Texas, on May 23, 1952. He is a fifth-generation San Antonian and a fifth-generation Mexican-American. Quiñones grew up in a Spanish-speaking household where he did not learn to speak English until he started school at age six. When he was 13 years old, his father was laid off from his job as a janitor at which the family joined a caravan of migrant farmworkers who traveled to Traverse City, Michigan, to harvest cherries. Later that summer, the Quiñones family followed the migrant route to pick tomatoes outside Toledo, Ohio.

While attending Brackenridge High School in San Antonio, Quiñones was selected to take part in the federal anti-poverty program, Upward Bound, which prepared inner-city high school students for college. As an undergraduate, Quiñones was also a member of the Sigma Beta-Zeta of Lambda Chi Alpha fraternity. After graduating from St. Mary's with a Bachelor of Arts degree in speech communication, Quiñones earned a Master of Arts degree from the Columbia University Graduate School of Journalism.

Career
Quiñones worked as a radio news editor at KTRH in Houston, Texas from 1975 to 1978 and also worked as an anchor and reporter for KPRC-TV.  He later reported for WBBM-TV in Chicago. In 1982, Quiñones started as a general assignment correspondent with ABC News based in Miami. He was a co-anchor of the ABC News program, Primetime, and hosted What Would You Do?. He also reports for all ABC News programs such as 20/20, Good Morning America, ABC World News Tonight, and Nightline.

According to communications attorney Mark Lloyd, "Quiñones told the League of United Latin American Citizens (LULAC) audience that he got his start because a San Antonio community organization threatened that if the stations didn't hire more Latinos, the group would go to the FCC (Federal Communications Commission) and challenge their licenses."

Awards
 George Foster Peabody Award, 1999, ABC News, New York, New York, "ABC 2000" (also known as ABC 2000 Today.)
 ALMA Award from the National Council of La Raza.
 CINE award for his report on suicide bombers in Israel.
 Gabriel Award.
 7-time Emmy Award winner.
 World Hunger Media Award and a Citation from the Robert F. Kennedy Journalism Award.
  Pigasus Award, 2005, ABC's Primetime Live, for its credulous "John of God " special, about Brazilian "psychic surgeon" João Teixeira
National Hispanic Media Coalition's Lifetime Achievement Award, 2016.

Books

References

External links
John Quiñones
Article "ABC's Primetime Star"

1952 births
Living people
American television reporters and correspondents
ABC News personalities
American television personalities of Mexican descent
Emmy Award winners
Television anchors from Chicago
Brackenridge High School alumni
Columbia University Graduate School of Journalism alumni
Journalists from San Antonio
Journalists from Texas
People from San Antonio
St. Mary's University, Texas alumni
20th-century American journalists
American male journalists
21st-century American journalists
What Would You Do? (2008 TV program)